The Concordia Stingers football team represents Concordia University in Montreal, Quebec in the sport of Canadian football in the RSEQ conference of U Sports. The Concordia Stingers football program was created in 1974 from the amalgamation of the Loyola Warriors and Sir George Williams Georgians. The team has won three Dunsmore Cup conference championships, in 1982, 1993, and 1998. In 1998, the Stingers also made their first and only appearance in the national championship which was a loss to the Saskatchewan Huskies in the 34th Vanier Cup game. 

The team is currently coached by Brad Collinson and plays home games at Concordia Stadium.

Recent results

A. Concordia originally finished in second place with a 5–3 record in 2001 and hosted a QIFC semi-final playoff game to third-place McGill, losing 11–8. However, Laval used an ineligible player throughout the entire season and vacated all regular season wins (forfeiting two wins against Concordia), giving Concordia a 7–1 record and a first place regular season finish albeit well after the 2001 season had concluded.

B. Bishop's and Concordia both used ineligible players in the same game, so the game was declared "no contest" in a double forfeit.

C. A 2017 game between the Montreal Carabins and Stingers was cancelled due to Montreal players and coaching staff members exhibiting flu symptoms. Due to scheduling constraints, the game was outright cancelled and would not be rescheduled. Montreal and Concordia would only play seven games as a result and winning percentage would be counted in the standings as opposed to point totals.

National award winners
J. P. Metras Trophy: Paul Chesser (1993), Troy Cunningham (2004)
Presidents' Trophy: Mickey Donovan (2004), Patrick Donovan (2005, 2006), Cory Greenwood (2009), Max Caron (2011)
Peter Gorman Trophy: Liam Mahoney (2007), Jeremy Murphy (2019), Jaylan Greaves (2021)

Stingers in the CFL
As of the end of the 2022 CFL season, three former Stingers players were on CFL teams' rosters:
Tanner Green, Edmonton Elks
Kristian Matte, Montreal Alouettes
Rene Paredes, Calgary Stampeders

References

External links
 Concordia Stingers

  
U Sports teams
U Sports football teams
U Sports teams in Montreal
U Sports teams in Quebec
Sports clubs established in 1974
1974 establishments in Quebec